The Grigorovich E-2, or DG-55 (Russian Григорович Э-2, ДГ-55), was a two-seat, twin-engined, low-wing, prototype sport aircraft of Soviet origin.

Design and construction

Inspired by the de Havilland DH.88 Comet racer which had won the MacRobertson Air Race in 1934, the Grigorovich OKB began work on a similar aircraft. Like the DH.88, the Russian "Kometa" was a highly streamlined conventional low-wing monoplane with twin engines forward of retractable main undercarriage in nacelles under each wing. Built of wood, it also featured an enclosed cockpit and landing flaps.

Intended to be a lightweight, high-speed sport aircraft the DG-55, later designated the E-2, was slightly smaller than the DH.88 and with less powerful engines, using  the  Cirrus Hermes.

Only one prototype was constructed, flying in 1935.

Operational history
Following completion of its flight tests, the E-2 Kometa was handed over to the OSOAVIAKhIM paramilitary sports organisation, who used it for light liaison duties.

Specifications

References

Further reading

External links
 
 Grigorovich DG-55 / E-2 Kometa, Airwar 1946.

Grigorovich aircraft
1930s Soviet aircraft
Twin piston-engined tractor aircraft
Aircraft first flown in 1935
Low-wing aircraft